Documentary analysis (document analysis) is a type of qualitative research in which documents are reviewed by the analyst to assess an appraisal theme. Dissecting documents involves coding content into subjects like how focus group or interview transcripts are investigated. A rubric can likewise be utilized to review or score a document. The three essential sorts of documents are:

 Public Records, such as understudy transcripts, statements of purpose, yearly reports, strategy manuals, understudy handbooks and vital arrangements 
 Personal Documents, such as date-books, messages, scrapbooks, online journals, Facebook posts, obligation logs, occurrence reports, reflections/diaries and daily papers 
 Physical Evidence, such as flyers, publications, plans, handbooks and training materials.

Applications

Requirements definition 
Document analysis can be used to accumulate requirements amid for a project. It collects available documents of related business procedures or systems and attempts to extract relevant data. Requirements can also be extracted from stakeholders via questionnaires, interviews, or focus groups. Document types include:

 Bench-marking studies
 Business plans
 Business process and method documentation 
 Company updates 
 Competing item writing and surveys 
 Customer contracts 
 Customer recommendations 
 Requests for proposals
 System imperfection reports 
 System particulars (of existing frameworks) 
 Training guides 
 Vision records for related undertakings

See also 
 Content analysis
 Focus Groups
 Semiotics

References

External links 
 Documentary analysis as a qualitative methodology to explore disaster mental health: insights from analysing a documentary on communal riots

Qualitative research